Janus is the two-faced Roman god of gates, doors, doorways, beginnings, and endings.

Janus may also refer to:

Computing 
 Janus (concurrent constraint programming language)
 Janus (DRM), a Microsoft Digital Rights Management platform
 Janus (protocol), a file transfer protocol for use on bulletin board systems
 Janus (time-reversible computing programming language)
 JANUS clinical trial data repository, a standard supported by the U.S. Food and Drug Administration
 Janus Recognition Toolkit (JRTk), a general purpose speech recognition toolkit
 Janus, a codename used for Windows 2000 (DEC Alpha and Itanium 64-bit editions)
 Janus attack, an alternative name of a Man-in-the-middle attack

People 
 Janus (given name)
 Janus (surname)
 Janus Prospero from the Resident Evil film series
 Janus of Cyprus (1375–1432), king of Cyprus from 1398 to 1432
 Janus I, Duke of Masovia
 J'anus, the claimed stage name of Janis McGavin, a performer on Balls of Steel Australia

Performing arts

Music 
 Janus Records, a record label
 Janvs, a black metal band from Liguria, Italy
 Janus (musical project), a German darkwave musical project established 1995
 Janus (American band), hard rock band, established in the mid-1990s in Chicago, Illinois
 Janus (album), the first full-length album released by Boyfriend

Film 
 Janus Films, an American film distribution company
 Janus, the criminal organization in the James Bond movie GoldenEye
 The Janus Project, a taboo cloning project in the movie Judge Dredd (film)

Other performing arts 
 Janus (play), a 1955 Broadway romantic comedy
 Janus (TV series), an Australian drama television series

Printed media

Comics
 Janus (comics), a list of characters
 Janus (Marvel Comics), Marvel Comics character
 Janus, DC Comics character known as Two-Face
 Janus, character in the novel Angels & Demons

Other printed media
 Janus (journal) (1896–1990), an academic journal on history of science and medicine published in Amsterdam
 Janus (science fiction magazine), a feminist science fiction magazine published from 1975-1980
 Janus: A Summing Up, a 1978 book by Arthur Koestler
 The Janus branch of the Cahill family in The 39 Clues
 Janus word or auto-antonym, a word with multiple meanings in which one is the reverse of another
 Janus, a French poetry magazine published in Paris by Elliott Stein from 1950 to 1961
 Janus (1971-2007), a British fetish magazine of erotic spanking and caning imagery.

Games and gaming 
 Janus Chess, a chess variant
 Janus Zeal, a character in the game Chrono Trigger

Places 
 Janus Island, an island of the Palmer Archipelago, Antarctica
 Mont Janus, a mountain near Mont Chaberton, France
 , a shallow volcanic crater on Io, a moon of Jupiter
 Janus (moon), a moon of Saturn

Science 
 Janus (moon), a moon of Saturn
 Janus (genus), a genus of stem sawflies in the family Cephidae
 Janus-faced molecule, used to describe a molecule whose effects on organisms can vary between beneficial and toxic
 Janus Experiments, a series of experiments on radio-sensitivity in mice and dogs
 Janus kinase, an intracellular signalling molecule; component of the JAK-STAT signal system
 Janus kinase inhibitor, a medication that inhibits the activity of the Janus kinase enzymes
 Janus particles, amphiphilic particles having one-half hydrophilic and the other half hydrophobic
  Janus TMD monolayers, a type of asymmetric transition-metal dichalcogenide monolayers
 Janus (spacecraft), a NASA mission to binary asteroids

Other uses 
 Janus (1810 ship) (1810–1832), built in New York, U.S.
 HMS Janus, a name used by British naval ships
 Janus Capital Group, an investment company based in Denver, Colorado
 Janus v. AFSCME, U.S. Supreme Court case (2018)
 Society of Janus, a San Francisco-based BDSM education and support group
 Schempp-Hirth Janus, a German two-seater glider
 Yorkshire Engine Company Janus, a British diesel shunting locomotive
 Zündapp Janus, a bubble car model by Zündapp
 Janus, catalogue database of Cambridge University Library
 Janus Motorcycles, a motorcycle manufacturer based in Goshen, Indiana

See also
Janis (disambiguation)
Janice (disambiguation)
Janusz